Christopher Bollen (born November 26, 1975) is an American novelist and magazine writer/editor who lives in New York City.

Describing his novels, The Daily Telegraph notes that "Bollen writes expansive, psychologically probing novels in the manner of Updike, Eugenides and Franzen, but he is also an avowed disciple of Agatha Christie."

Early life
Raised in Cincinnati, Ohio, Bollen graduated Phi Beta Kappa from Columbia University in 1998.

Career
Bollen was the editor-in-chief of Interview from early 2008 to mid-2009, after serving as editor-in-chief of V. After stepping down as editor-in-chief, he continued on as editor-at-large of Interview. On May 21, 2018, the publication ceased operations completely after nearly 50 years.

Bollen also writes about art and culture at other publications like Artforum and The New York Times.

Novels
Bollen published his first novel, Lightning People, in 2011. Lightning People is about downtown New York City in 2007.

His second novel is titled Orient, a thriller published in May 2015 by HarperCollins named after Orient, New York (the tip of the North Fork of Long Island). The Los Angeles Times writes that Orient "might well be this summer's most ambitious thriller or this summer's most thrilling work of literary fiction." The Times further describes it as a "juicy mystery at the tip of Long Island at summer's end, when the season's fleeting pleasures have blown away, revealing the fractured and fractious year-round community that remains behind when the casual visitors have returned to the relative safety of New York City."

Bollen's third novel, The Destroyers, was published on June 27, 2017, by HarperCollins. It is set on the island of Patmos, Greece, where the Book of Revelation was thought to be written and was describing by the New York Times as "evoking a seductive mood of longing mixed with regret." It was honoured with The Fitzgerald Award in France. His fourth novel, A Beautiful Crime, was published in January 2020 by HarperCollins. The novel deals with two young gay men involved in a heist in contemporary Venice, Italy. It was a Best Book of the year 2020 by Oprah Magazine. The novel went on to be a finalist for the 2020 Los Angeles Times Book Prize.

Bollen's short story "SWAJ", a queer retelling of Peter Benchley's Jaws published in the Brooklyn Rail, was selected for inclusion in 2021's The Best American Mystery and Suspense.

References

External links
 

Living people
1975 births
21st-century American novelists
Journalists from New York City
Writers from Cincinnati
American magazine editors
Columbia College (New York) alumni
American male novelists
American LGBT journalists
American LGBT novelists
American gay writers
21st-century American male writers
Novelists from New York (state)
21st-century American non-fiction writers
American male non-fiction writers
21st-century American LGBT people
Vanity Fair (magazine) people